Russell Gordon Napier (28 November 1910 – 19 August 1974) was an Australian actor.

Biography

Russell Napier was born in Perth, Western Australia.  Originally a lawyer, Napier was active as an actor on the stage as early as 1936; on the screen, from 1947 to 1974, playing both comedic and dramatic roles in both cinema and television. He starred in a live BBC television production of H. G. Wells' The Time Machine in 1949; only still photographs of this production survive.

Napier also acted on stage, and in 1936 appeared in a production of T.S. Eliot's Murder in the Cathedral at The Old Vic, which later transferred to Broadway.

He was the most frequent star of the Scotland Yard series of short films originally released from 1953 to 1961 for screenings in British cinemas, playing Inspector Harmer in two films, and then DI (later Superintendent) Duggan in thirteen others. The series was aired in the United States by the American Broadcasting Company from 1957.

He was the commentator of the official 1962 TV documentary Sound an Alarm, about the United Kingdom Warning and Monitoring Organisation and he appeared as Doctor Green in the UFO 1970 TV series episode "A Question of Priorities". He died in Kingston upon Thames, Surrey, England.

Selected filmography

 The End of the River (1947) – The Padre
 Death of an Angel (1952) – Supt. Walshaw
 Blind Man's Bluff (1952) – Stevens
 Stolen Face (1952) – Det. Cutler
 Black Orchid (1953) – Inspector Markham
 The Saint's Return (1953) – Col. Stafford
 36 Hours (1953) – Detective at Ann's Apartment (uncredited) 
 Conflict of Wings (1954) – Wing Cmdr. Rogers
 The Unholy Four (1954) – Insp. Treherne
 Companions in Crime (1954)
 The Brain Machine (1955) – Inspector Durham
 Little Red Monkey (1955) – Supt. John Harrington
 The Blue Peter (1955) – Raymound Curtis
 A Time to Kill (1955) – Inspector Simmons
 The Narrowing Circle (1956) – Sir Henry Dimmock
 The Man in the Road (1956) – Scotland Yard Supt. David
 A Town Like Alice (1956) – Jack Burns (uncredited)
 Je plaide non-coupable (1956) – Inspector Hobson
 The Last Man to Hang? (1956) – Detective Sgt. Bolton
 The Shiralee (1957) – Parker
 Robbery Under Arms (1957) – Banker Green
 A Night to Remember (1958) – Capt. Stanley Lord – Californian
 Tread Softly Stranger (1958) – Potter
 The Son of Robin Hood (1958) – Squire Miles
 The Witness (1959) – Inspector Rosewarne
 Sink the Bismarck! (1960) – Air Vice-Marshal (uncredited)
 The Angry Silence (1960) – Thompson
 Hell Is a City (1960) – Superintendent
 The Mark (1961) – Second Plain Clothes Officer
 Francis of Assisi (1961) – Brother Elias
 H.M.S. Defiant (1962) – Flag Captain
 Mix Me a Person (1962) – PC Jarrold
 Man in the Middle (1964) – Col. J.H. Thompson
 It! (1967) – Boss
 The Blood Beast Terror (1968) – Landlord
 Nobody Runs Forever (1968) – Leeds
 Twisted Nerve (1968) – Professor Fuller
 The Black Windmill (1974) – Admiral Ballantyne (uncredited) (final film role)

References

External links
 
 

1910 births
1974 deaths
Australian male stage actors
Australian male film actors
Australian male television actors
Australian people of Scottish descent
Male actors from Perth, Western Australia
20th-century Australian male actors